Wayne Scott is a politician from the U.S. state of Oregon. He was a member of the Oregon House of Representatives for the Republican Party until 2009, representing House District 39, which includes the communities of Barlow, Beavercreek, Canby, Mulino and Oregon City. He was House Minority Leader for the 2007 legislative session. He announced his retirement as minority leader in August 2007. He has remained active in supporting Republican candidates in the state.

References

External links
Representative Wayne Scott (official legislative website)

Republican Party members of the Oregon House of Representatives
Politicians from Canby, Oregon
Living people
Year of birth missing (living people)
21st-century American politicians